Richard Kingsford may refer to:

 Richard Ash Kingsford (1821–1902), mayor of Brisbane and Cairns, member of the Queensland state parliament, Australia
 Richard Kingsford (ecologist), environmental/biological expert and river ecologist